VTV is a television channel in El Salvador, operated by Telecorporación Salvadoreña. The channel transmits on UHF channel 35 and relays Univisión programming.

The channel, unlike the other TCS channels, is 24/7 and doesn't link with channels 2, 4 and 6 in the morning hours.

September, 25, 2017 the channel is called now as TCS+

Television stations in El Salvador
Television channels and stations established in 2003
Spanish-language television stations